Andrew Steele is an athlete.

Andrew Steele may also refer to:

Andrew Steele (astrobiologist)
Andrew Steele of The Herd
Andrew Steele, screenwriter of The Spoils of Babylon etc.

See also
Steele (surname)